Taste the Nation with Padma Lakshmi is an American travel and food docuseries released on Hulu on June 19, 2020. It stars Padma Lakshmi and follows her on her travels around the United States to learn about a specific food and culture in each city.

In August 2020 Hulu renewed the show for a second season for 10 episodes which was later truncated to 4 episodes due to the COVID-19 pandemic and released as a holiday edition. In March 2023 it was reported that Taste the Nation with Padma Lakshmi would return on Hulu on May 5, 2023, with a 10-episode second season.

Episodes

Series Overview

Season 1 (2020)

Taste the Nation: Holiday Edition (2021)

Season 2 (2023)

References 

2020s American documentary television series